Real Sound: Kaze no Regret, literally "Real Sound: Regret of Wind", is an adventure audio game developed by Warp and published by Sega. The game was first released for the Saturn in July 1997, and later for the Dreamcast in March 1999. Real Sound was intended to provide equal access to sighted and blind players. The subtitle Kaze no Regret means "regret of wind" or "wind's regret".

Gameplay
Although a version featuring an optional "Visual mode" was made in 1999 for the Sega Dreamcast, both versions of the game rely exclusively on the audio portions of the game with the Dreamcast's Visual mode merely displaying non-essential still photos at certain points of the game.

Constructed as an interactive radio drama or an audio gamebook, the player spends the majority of the time listening as the story unfolds. At critical forks in the plot line, a set of chimes will ring, alerting the player that it is now their job to choose the course the plot will take. The choice that is selected is confirmed with the controller and the plot resumes.

Plot
The storyline was written by Takamatsu Ogawa to center around two central elements - fear and love - in a story that unfolds in Tokyo. Izumi Sakurai (voiced by Ryoko Shinohara), an elementary student, is moved to a new school where she joins a new class of students and is seated next to Hiroshi Nonomura. The two fall in love and because they are so young they decide to elope. They arrange to meet at a clock tower to begin their flight, but Izumi never shows up and shortly afterward she is transferred away again. They meet again coincidentally a month later.

Several years later, Hiroshi has now become a college student. Izumi is entering the job market and is having meetings and interviews with company personnel managers. Suddenly there is a disappearance that takes place in the subway system...

Development
Warp's president, Kenji Eno, created the game after receiving numerous appreciation letters from blind fans of his games in Japan. Eno visited a number of his visually disabled fans to learn how it is that blind people could play the visually rich action game genre.

In a 2008 interview with 1Up, Eno stated:

I had a chance to visit people who are visually disabled, and I learned that there are blind people who play action games. Of course, [blind people are] not able to have the full experience, and they're kind of trying to force themselves to be able to play, but they're making the effort. So I thought that if you turn off the monitor, both of you are just hearing the game. So after you finish the game, you can have an equal conversation about it with a blind person. That's an inspiration behind [Real Sound: Kaze no Regret] as well.

So excited was Eno about the project that he used his clout as a first-class game designer to bargain with Sega such that in exchange for the exclusive rights to the game, Sega would donate a thousand Sega Saturn consoles to blind people. Eno, in turn, subsequently donated a thousand copies of Real Sound along with the game consoles. In explaining why the game has only been re-released once despite apparent interest in the title, Eno has stated that: "It's been several years now, and of course the contract probably isn't valid anymore, but the reason that I haven't done anything with this game is that I made this promise with Sega back in the day, and it's exclusive because of those conditions."

The game features a number of secondary characters that employ the vocal talents of such people as Miho Kanno and Ai Maeda, and music that was composed and performed by Keiichi Suzuki (later known for The Blind Swordsman: Zatoichi and Outrage trilogy), with Akiko Yano composing the ending theme, the game was written by Yūji Sakamoto, who later went on to write Crying Out Love in the Center of the World with Isao Yukisada.

Legacy
The game had mediocre sales and has become something of a collector's item due to the cult popularity of Eno's other titles. Further driving the collectibility of the game are the variety of feelies included with the game - a signature move that Eno had become known for. Included with Real Sound were such oddities as a set of instructions in braille, a bag of "Herb seeds", and a transparent box with a cloud motif.

A version of the game representing only one path through the game aired on Tokyo FM in 1997.

A number of Eno's later games such as Enemy Zero (1997, Saturn), and D2 (2000, Dreamcast) have been influenced by Real Sound'''s unique gameplay. Certain enemies in Enemy Zero were invisible and could only be located by sound, and D2 also drew heavily from the concept of limitations to sensory perceptions, featuring portions of the game where the character is rendered blind (with only a voice to guide her) and alternately deaf (with only vision to guide her).

A sequel to Kaze no Regret called  was under development as a second game in what was intended to become the Real Sound series. Kiri no Orgel was to feature a horror theme. Advertisements for the game appeared in a number of magazines, but it was never released due to problems with voice-compression technology. Story arcs from Kiri no Orgel were later employed by Eno in D2. The third installment to the series entitled  was planned as a comedy, but planning for this title was minimal and the title was never developed.Real Sound: Kaze no Regret'' has become one of the most popular games for the blind because it is one of the few commercially released audio games specifically created with the blind in mind.

Notes

References

External links
 Real Sound - Kaze no Riglet at AudioGames.net
 AUDIO+ | A Real Sound Kaze No Regret Video Document | by dieubussy

1997 video games
Audio games
Dreamcast games
Japan-exclusive video games
Sega Saturn games
Video games developed in Japan
Video games scored by Keiichi Suzuki
Visual novels
Works by Yûji Sakamoto
Single-player video games